Sunshine West is a suburb in Melbourne, Victoria, Australia,  west of Melbourne's central business district, located within the City of Brimbank local government area.

Sunshine West is a residential and industrial area. It is bounded by Forrest Street in the north, Kororoit Creek in the east, Boundary Road in the south and the Western Ring Road in the west.

Settlement of the area dates from the 1920s when the Sunshine Heights Estate was developed. Sunshine West Post Office opened on 1 July 1939 and closed in 1981. Significant development did not occur until the post-war years, with rapid growth from the 1970s through to the 1980s. The population declined slightly from the early 1990s, a result of some new dwellings being added to the area, but a decline in the average number of persons living in each dwelling.

Sunshine West presently features a significant ethnically diverse population, being home to many refugees and immigrant families that have settled from Europe, Asia and the Pacific, especially from Malta, Greece, Italy, North Macedonia, Croatia, Vietnam, China and the Philippines.

Major features of the area include the Sunshine Wisdom Lodge – Freemasons Victoria, Saint Leopold Mandić Croatian Catholic Church and Centre, West Sunshine Community Centre, Ainsworth Reserve, Buckingham Reserve, Norm Talintyre Reserve, the Australia Post Parcel Facility, the nearby Ardeer railway station and numerous schools.

The suburb hosts the Sunshine Heights Football Club in the Western Regional Football League.

Places of worship
 Saint Leopold Mandić Croatian Catholic Church, located on the corner of Fitzgerald Road and Whitesides Avenue
 Saint Paul's Roman Catholic Church, located on Glengala Road
 Saint Andrew's Greek Orthodox Church, located on St Andrew Street
 Saint Anthony's Greek Orthodox Church, located on Armstrong Street

See also
 City of Sunshine – Sunshine West was previously within this former local government area.

References

Suburbs of Melbourne
Suburbs of the City of Brimbank